Seytyakovo (Häytäk) is a rural locality (a selo) and the administrative centre of Seytyakovsky Selsoviet, Baltachevsky District, Bashkortostan, Russia. The population was 746 as of 2010. There are 19 streets.

Geography 
Seytyakovo is located 14 km southwest of Starobaltachevo (the district's administrative centre) by road. Churapanovo is the nearest rural locality.

References 

Rural localities in Baltachevsky District
Ufa Governorate